Cooper Nuclear Station (CNS) is a boiling water reactor (BWR) type nuclear power plant located  on a  site near Brownville, Nebraska between Missouri River mile markers 532.9 and 532.5, on Nebraska's border with Missouri. It is the largest single-unit electrical generator in Nebraska.

Description
CNS is owned and operated by the Nebraska Public Power District (NPPD), a political subdivision of the state of Nebraska.

The facility is named after Humboldt natives Guy Cooper Jr., and Guy Cooper Sr.  The senior Cooper's father, O. A. Cooper, built the first electrical plant in Humboldt in 1890; the two Guy Coopers served a total of 27 years on the board of NPPD and its predecessor agency, Consumers Public Power District.

CNS was first put into operation in July 1974 and generates approximately 800 megawatts (MWe) of electricity. The plant consists of a General Electric BWR/4 series reactor plant and a Westinghouse turbine generator. The plant has a Mark I containment system.

In 1998, CNS was the first plant in the United States to load nuclear fuel containing uranium that had been provided under the Megatons to Megawatts Program, in which uranium removed from nuclear weapons of the former Soviet Union was turned into low-enriched uranium and then into fuel.

In September 2008, NPPD applied to the U.S. Nuclear Regulatory Commission (NRC) for a renewal of the operating license for CNS, extending it for an additional twenty years.
In November 2010 CNS received its license renewal, which was the 60th renewal license to be issued by the NRC.

In late 2003 NPPD signed a contract with Entergy Nuclear for management support services. An agreement was approved in January 2010 by NPPD to extend Entergy's management support services until January 2029. The original contract between the companies, signed in 2003, was for the remaining years of the plant's original operating license, which ran until January 18, 2014. In March 2022 NPPD announced that the Entergy contract would be terminated.

Electricity Production

Surrounding population
In 2010, the population within 10 miles of Cooper was 4,414; the population within 50 miles was 163,610.

Seismic risk
The Nuclear Regulatory Commission's estimate of the risk each year of an earthquake intense enough to cause core damage to the reactor at CNS was 1 in 142,857, according to an NRC study published in August 2010.

Events 
At 0402 CDT on June 19, 2011 a Notification of Unusual Event (the lowest of NRC emergency classifications) was declared due to the elevation of the Missouri River reaching 899.1 feet above mean sea level. This is above the Emergency Action Level HU1.5 elevation of 899 feet. Later, the Missouri River reached 900.6 feet on 6/23/2011 while elevation of 902 feet is the alert level for the plant.
  The plant left the emergency status at 9:47 a.m., July 12 after the river dropped to 895.8 feet—3 feet below the emergency status level. The nearby Fort Calhoun Nuclear Generating Station also faced flooding during this period.

On March 15, 2019, another Unusual Event low-level emergency was declared at Cooper due to flooding, with a forecast crest that exceeds the 2011 flooding.

See also 

 Port of Omaha

Notes

External links

Nebraska Public Power District

Nuclear power plants in Nebraska
Buildings and structures in Nemaha County, Nebraska
Energy infrastructure completed in 1974
1974 establishments in Nebraska